Reijo Laine (born 28 January 1937 in Helsinki) is a sailor from Finland, who represented his country at the 1976 Summer Olympics in Kingston, Ontario, Canada as crew member in the Soling. With helmsman Matti Jokinen and fellow crew member Matti Paloheimo they took the 18th place.

References

Living people
1935 births
Sailors at the 1976 Summer Olympics – Soling
Olympic sailors of Finland
Finnish male sailors (sport)
Sportspeople from Helsinki